
Gmina Ropa is a rural gmina (administrative district) in Gorlice County, Lesser Poland Voivodeship, in southern Poland.

Villages
The gmina contains the villages of Klimkówka, Łosie and Ropa.

Neighbouring gminas
Gmina Ropa is bordered by the town of Grybów and by the gminas of Gorlice, Grybów and Uście Gorlickie.

References
Polish official population figures 2006

Ropa
Gorlice County